The manuscript 4Q120 (also pap4QLXXLevb; AT22; VH 46; Rahlfs 802; LDAB 3452) is a Septuagint manuscript (LXX) of the biblical Book of Leviticus written on papyrus, found at Qumran. The Rahlfs-No. is 802. Palaoegraphycally it dates from the first century BCE.  Currently the manuscript is housed in the Rockefeller Museum in Jerusalem.

History 
The manuscript was written in the Hasmonean period, and Patrick W. Skehan dated 4Q120 to "late first century BCE or opening years of the first century CE". In the 1st century CE, the 4Q120 with several documents was taken by Jewish fugitives (Bar Kokhba's troops, women and children) who were taking refuge in the Caves of Nahal Hever. The manuscript was found at Qumran, Cave 4b. Cave 4 was discovered in August 1952, and was excavated on 22–29 September 1952 by Gerald Lankester Harding, Roland de Vaux, and Józef Milik.

Description 
This scroll is in a very fragmented condition. Today it consists of 97 fragments. However, only 31 of those fragments can be reasonably reconstructed and deciphered, allowing for a reading of Leviticus 1.11 through 5.25; the remaining fragments are too small to allow for reliable identification. Additionally, space bands are occasionally used for the separation of concepts, and divisions within the text. A special sign (⌐) for separation of paragraphs is found fragment 27, between the lines 6 and 7. While the later divisions would label these verses 5:20-26, it appears to testify to a classical transition from chapter 5 to 6. Scriptio continua is used throughout.

Version 
Emanuel Tov agrees with Eugene Ulrich that "4QLXXNum is a superior representative of the Old Greek text that LXXGö." Albert Pietersma says that "the genuinely Septuagintal credentials of 4QLXXLevb are well-nigh impeccable." Within what he called "limited scope of evidence", Patrick W. Skehan describes it "as a considerable reworking of the original LXX to make it conform both in quantity and in diction to a Hebrew consonantal text nearly indistinguishable [...] from that of MT." According to Wilkinson, 4Q120 "is an irreproachably Septuagint text from the 1st century B.C. which bears no trace of having been subsequently conformed to the Hebrew text".

ΙΑꞶ 

The presence of the name of God in this ancient manuscript has supported the conclusion of some scholars that this was the original form in the Septuagint. Skehan, Tov and Ulrich agrees that "this writing of the divine name is more original than Κύριος".

He states that "the writing of the Tetragrammaton in Hebrew characters in Greek revisional texts is a relatively late phenomenon.

According to Shaw: 

The Codex Marchalianus gives , not as a part of the Scripture text, but instead in marginal notes on Ezekiel 1:2 and 11:1, as in several other marginal notes it gives ΠΙΠΙ.

Greek text 

Text according to A. R. Meyer:

Lev 4:27

[αφεθησεται ]αυτωι εαν[ δε ψυχη μια] 
[αμαρτ]η[ι α]κουσιως εκ[ του λαου της] 
[γης ]εν τωι ποιησαι μιαν απ[ο πασων] 
των εντολων ιαω ου πο[ιηθησε] 

Lev 3:12–13

[τωι ιαω] 12 εαν δ[ε απο των αιγων] 
[το δωρ]ον αυτο[υ και προσαξει εν] 
[αντι ι]αω 13 και ε[πιθησει τας χει] 

Romanization of Meyer:

Lev 4:27

[aphethēsetai ]autōi ean[ de psychē mia] 
[hamart]ē[i a]kousiōs ek[ tou laou tēs] 
[gēs ]en tōi poiēsai mian ap[o pasōn] 
tōn entolōn iaō hou po[iēthēse] 

Lev 3:12–13

[tōi iaō] 12 ean d[e apo tōn aigōn] 
[to dōr]on auto[u kai prosaxei en] 
[anti i]aō 13 kai e[pithēsei tas chei] 

NIV:

Lev 4:27

he will be forgiven. If any member of the community
sins unintentionally and does 
what is forbidden in any of the LORD’s
commands, when they realize...

Lev 3:12–13

...to the LORD. If your offering is 
a goat, you are to present 
it before the LORD, lay your hand...

References

Bibliography

External links 
 Image of fragment 20 of the 4Q120 scroll
 

1st-century BC biblical manuscripts
Dead Sea Scrolls
Septuagint manuscripts